Uncompahgre County was a short-lived county in the state of Colorado that existed between 27 February and 2 March 1883, briefly replacing Ouray County.

History
On 27 February 1883, the Colorado General Assembly renamed Ouray County as Uncompahgre County. It was named after the Uncompahgre Ute people, a band of Native American tribe Ute. Three days later on 2 March 1883, the General Assembly changed its mind and changed the name of Uncompahgre County back to Ouray County.

See also

Outline of Colorado
Index of Colorado-related articles
List of counties in Colorado
Ouray County, Colorado

References

Former counties of Colorado
Ouray County, Colorado